Clinton Levering Cobb (August 25, 1842 – April 30, 1879) was a U.S. Representative from North Carolina.

Born in Elizabeth City, North Carolina, Cobb attended the common schools and was graduated from the University of North Carolina at Chapel Hill.  He studied law.  He was admitted to the bar in 1867 and commenced practice in Elizabeth City.  He engaged in the mercantile business.

Cobb was elected as a Republican to the Forty-first, Forty-second, and Forty-third Congresses (March 4, 1869 – March 3, 1875).  He served as chairman of the Committee on the Freedman's Bureau (Forty-second and Forty-third Congresses).  He was an unsuccessful candidate for reelection in 1874 to the Forty-fourth Congress.  He resumed the practice of law in Elizabeth City, and died there on April 30, 1879.  He was interred in Episcopal Cemetery.

Sources

1842 births
1879 deaths
Republican Party members of the United States House of Representatives from North Carolina
People from Elizabeth City, North Carolina
19th-century American politicians